Casearia crassinervis is a species of flowering plant in the family Salicaceae. It is endemic to Cuba.

References

Flora of Cuba
crassinervis
Endemic flora of Cuba
Vulnerable plants
Taxonomy articles created by Polbot